The Rouen tramway (known locally as "Métro de Rouen") is a tramway/light rail network in the city of Rouen, Normandy, France. Construction began in 1991 and the network opened for service on 17 December 1994.

Modern network 
The tramway consists of two lines that share a common route in the north in and diverting into two southern branches to Saint-Étienne-du-Rouvray and Le Grand-Quevilly. The northernmost section of the line within Rouen city centre runs through a  underground (subway) section in the Rouen city centre encompassing stations Joffre–Mutualité through Bouvoisine. At the Théâtre des Arts station, transfers between the tramway and Rouen's three bus rapid transit lines (T1-T3) can take place; while transfers between the tramway and the SNCF railway line take place at Gare–Rue Verte station. The remainder of the tramway to the south of the underground portion runs on the road surface and on reserved track.

In light of the fact that the new mode of transport technically is a light railway/tramway, inhabitants of Rouen and its suburbs have taken the habit of calling it the 'métro'. In September 1997 the tramway was extended to the Technopôle du Madrillet.

Technical data 
 Length of the network : 
 Number of stops : 31
 Number of tramcars : 28
 Tramcar capacity : 178
 Average commercial speed : 
 Maximum speed: 
 Daily traffic: 65,000 journeys
 Opening hours: 5:00am to 11:30pm
 Frequency of service: every 3 minutes (peak); every 20 minutes (off peak)

Rolling stock 
The original rolling stock used by the system until 2012 was the GEC Alsthom Tramway Français Standard (TFS), identical to those used on the Grenoble tramway (1987) and Paris Tramway Line 1.

In January 2010, Alstom was awarded a €90m contract to supply 27 Citadis 402 trams in 2011–2012 to replace the TFS cars. All TFS trams were removed from service in 2012 and were subsequently shipped to Gaziantep, Turkey as an expansion fleet for a newly built tram line in that city.

Former tramway 

The first tramway was steam hauled, opened in 1874 and was owned by Gustav Palmer Harding. The Compagnie des Tramways de Rouen (CTR) was created on 11 September 1878. Steam hauling stopped in 1884 due to rising costs and the ineffectiveness of the system, the tramways then were horse drawn.

On 19 June 1892 a funicular railway linking Rouen to Bonsecours opened. Two years later, in 1894, the decision to operate all tramways electrically was made.

A second company, the Compagnie Générale de Traction (CGT) was created in 1895 and opened lines to Bapeaume, Amfreville-la-Mi-Voie and Bihorel. The CTR electrified its tramway network from 22 March 1896 in time for the Colonial Exposition of 1896, organised in Rouen.

The CGT and CTR were supplemented by a third tramway company, the Compagnie du Tramway de Bonsecours, which in 1899 opened a line from Rouen's Pont Corneille to Bonsecours. To reach Bonsecours, the line had to climb a steep ramp, reaching 60 mm/m (6%) and 80 mm/m (8%). This made the total length of network 38 km long. In 1906, a short lived line linking le Trianon to the Forêt du Rouvray opened, this closed in 1908.

In 1910, The CGT, the Compagnie du Tramway de Bonsecours merged into the CTR. Two years later, the tramway was extended to Bois-Guillaume. The last line was opened on 1 August 1915, this stretched between Rouen and Grand-Quevilly, its purpose was to link military camps to the city-centre. A fire broke out in the Trianon depot on 30 November 1921.

In 1930, the first bus line began operations between Place Beauvoisine and Cimetière Nord. The first tramway line closure occurred the same year and was replaced by buses.

The trolleybus made a discreet appearance in 1933 during tests, the first line opened in 1937 and linked Mont-Saint-Aignan to the city.

For six years, between 9 June 1940 and 20 April 1946, crossing of the River Seine was interrupted due to the World War II hostilities. The line to Amfreville was closed and replaced by buses in 1948.

On 28 February 1953, the last tramway line closed, followed in 1970 by the last trolleybus.

The tramway system was operated by three companies, all using  standard gauge tramcars.

Depots 
The Compagnie des Tramways de Rouen (CTR) kept its rolling stock in three tramway depots;
 Trianon, situated on the south bank of the river Seine
 Bonsecours, situated at the top of the incline of the same name.
 Maromme, situated in the north of the city.

Network Map

See also 
 Trams in Rouen
 Transportation in Rouen
 Trams in France
 List of town tramway systems in France

References

External links 

  
 Rouen on UrbanRail.net 
 Rouen Seine valley Tourist Board's Website

Rouen
Transport in Rouen
Rouen